WQBZ (106.3 FM) is a radio station  broadcasting a mainstream rock format. Licensed to Fort Valley, Georgia, United States, the station serves the Macon area.  The station is currently owned by iHeartMedia, Inc. and licensed to iHM Licenses, LLC.

History
WQBZ-FM signed on the air on April 6, 1981, and it broadcast an Adult Contemporary format. The format lasted throughout the rest of the 1980s and into the earlier half of the 1990s. It was first known as "Z106" before becoming "Q106" in 1989. WQBZ is Macon's dominant affiliate for Rick Dees Weekly Top 40 and Dan Ingram's Top 40 Satellite Survey. It switched to its current mainstream rock format by the mid-to-late 1990s. It became Q106.3 in 2013.

References

External links

QBZ
Mainstream rock radio stations in the United States
IHeartMedia radio stations